Lino Mannocci (1945 – March 2021) was an Italian painter, printmaker and writer.

Life
He was born in Viareggio, Italy, and moved to London in 1968. Between 1971 and 1976 he studied at Camberwell College of Arts and as a postgraduate at the Slade School of Fine Art in London. From 1976, Mannocci has returned annually to a little Italian hamlet in the hills between Lucca and Viareggio. He died in London, March 2021.

Career

In the early 1980s Mannocci was a co-founder of the movement La Metacosa and was closely involved in all the group's exhibitions and activities. His first Museum exhibition was in 1984 at the 'Hack-Museum' in Ludwigshafen, Germany. During the 1990s he exhibited his work in San Francisco, New York, London, Milan, Florence and Bergamo. In 2004 his recent paintings were included in the exhibition curated by Philippe Daverio at the Spazio Oberdan in Milan called Fenomenologia della Metacosa – 7 artisti nel 1979 a Milano e 25 anni dopo, and in 2005 he had a one-person show entitled Let there be smoke at the Museo H. Christian Andersen in Rome. In 2006 Mannocci exhibited in Delhi and Mumbai in India, and in 2007 he curated an exhibition at the Galleria Ceribelli in Bergamo called Gli amici pittori di Londra, a homage to painting and friendship. On the occasion of his exhibition in 2010 of monotypes at the Fitzwilliam Museum in Cambridge, Clouds and Myths, Mannocci curated an exhibition on the theme of the Annunciation, The Angel and the Virgin: A Brief History of the Annunciation. The Cartiere Vannucci in Milan exhibited his paintings in 2012.  In October, he exhibited his work in New York at Jill Newhouse Gallery. He had an exhibition at Galleria San Fedele in Milan, E l’angelo partì da lei, in 2014. In the following year, 2015, he presented a solo exhibition of recent works at the Galleria Nazionale d’Arte Moderna di Palazzo Pitti in Florence. In May, an invitation to commemorate the 8th centenary of the Magna Carta at Temple Church, London, resulted in a show of monotypes on parchment. In June, he exhibited a group of treated postcards at London’s Estorick Collection, Shaping the Image which concerned the main protagonists of the Futurists movement. In 2017, Mannocci participated in the 'Shared Sacred Sites' project showing work in the Macedonian Museum of Contemporary Art, Thessaloniki, Greece. The following year the exhibition travelled to The Graduate Centre CUNY, New York. In July 2019, he curated an exhibition of Gino Severini’s work at the Museo Novecento, Florence and in September, he had a solo show of works relating to the theme of the wedding of Gino Severini and Jeanne Fort in 1913.  In December 2019 Mannocci exhibited works on the occasion of the 40th anniversary of the Metacosa.

Gli Amici Pittori di Londra
Gli Amici Pittori di Londra (My Painter Friends in London) was the title given to an exhibition of work by Mannocci and his British artist friends held in 2007 at the Galleria Ceribelli in Bergamo, Italy. The artists – both past and present – share between them various degrees of contact based on friendship and example, as well as occasional links through galleries and exhibitions in London and elsewhere. The success of the initial exhibition has generated other shows by the group over subsequent years. In 2008, Genius Loci at the Galleria Ceribelli, 2010, Another Country, at the Estorick Collection, London, and in 2015, saw Vital Signs, at Clifford Chance, London, which also travelled to the Fondazione Bottari Lattes, in Monforte d'Alba, Italy.

Collections
Mannocci's work is in the collections of the British Museum in London, Altonaer Museum in Hamburg, W.Hack Museum in Ludwigshafen, Musée Jenisch in Vevey, Mead Art Museum in Amherst and Fitzwilliam Museum in Cambridge.

Publications
In 1988 he wrote the catalogue raisonné of the graphic work of Claude Lorrain for Yale University Press. On  the occasion of the 2007 exhibition, Gli amici pittori di Londra, he wrote the accompanying catalogue, published by Lubrina Editore, Bergamo. In 2008, following a visit to New Delhi and Mumbai, he wrote Madre India, Padre Barbiere, a text on the experience of the journey and personal memories, alongside photographs of Indian barbers, for Skira Imprint. In 2010, he curated and wrote the catalogue for the exhibition, The Angel and the Virgin: A Brief History of the Annunciation at the Fitzwilliam Museum, Cambridge. Also in 2010, as part of the catalogue for the exhibition, Another Country at the Estorick Collection in London, he wrote an essay, De Chirico, Carra and the Metaphysical Years. In 2019, Mannocci wrote Scene da un matrimonio fuțurista: Gino Severini sposa Jeanne Fort a Parigi nel 1913, published by affinità elettive, Ancona.

References

1945 births
Living people
20th-century Italian painters
Italian male painters
21st-century Italian painters
Alumni of the Slade School of Fine Art
20th-century Italian male artists
21st-century Italian male artists